Patricia Nellie Moore (born 13 August 1930) is a New Zealand former cricketer who played as an all-rounder, batting left-handed and bowling right-arm medium. She appeared in two Test matches for New Zealand, one in 1961 and one in 1966. She played domestic cricket for Canterbury.

References

External links
 
 

1930 births
Living people
Cricketers from Christchurch
New Zealand women cricketers
New Zealand women Test cricketers
Canterbury Magicians cricketers